is a passenger railway station] located in the city of Tokushima, Tokushima Prefecture, Japan. It is operated by JR Shikoku and has the station number "B02".

Lines
Besides local service trains, the Tsurugisan limited express service also stops at Kuramoto.

Layout
The station consists of two opposed side platforms serving 2 tracks. The station building is unstaffed and serves only as a waiting room. Access to the opposite side platform is by means of a footbridge. Several sidings branch off both tracks.

Platforms

Adjacent stations

History
The station was opened on 12 September 1899 by the privately run Tokushima Railway. When the company was nationalized on 1 September 1907, Japanese Government Railways (JGR) took over control of the station and operated it as part of the Tokushima Line (later the Tokushima Main Line). With the privatization of Japanese National Railways (JNR), the successor of JGR, on 1 April 1987, the station came under the control of JR Shikoku. On 1 June 1988, the line was renamed the Tokushima Line.

Passenger statistics
In fiscal 2019, the station was used by an average of 453 passengers daily

Surrounding area
The station is located center of the western part of Tokushima city and is a student town centered on the Kuramoto Campus of Tokushima University. The area around the station is a cohesive commercial area. It is also where large-scale hospitals such as Tokushima University Hospital are concentrated.
Tokushima University Hospital
Tokushima Prefectural Central Hospital
Tokushima Prefectural Medical Examination Center

See also
List of railway stations in Japan

References

External links

 JR Shikoku timetable

Railway stations in Tokushima Prefecture
Railway stations in Japan opened in 1899
Tokushima (city)